Arnar Bragi Bergsson (born 30 April 1993) is an Icelandic footballer and singer. In 2018, Bragi came third in the fourteenth season of the singing competition Swedish Idol. In 2023, he finished in the top five in the Söngvakeppnin. He holds both Icelandic and Swedish citizenship.

Early life
Bragi was born in Reykjavík, Iceland, to Icelandic parents. The family moved to Sweden when he was around two years old when his father, who is a doctor, went to further his education. He took to using his middle name due to Swedish people having trouble pronouncing his first name. He holds both Icelandic and Swedish citizenship.

Football

Club career
In 2013, Bragi moved back to Iceland and played for ÍBV in the top-tier Úrvalsdeild karla. In 2015, he moved back to Sweden and signed with GAIS. He returned  to Iceland in 2016 and played for Fylkir. In December 2017, Bragi signed a two-year contract with Utsiktens BK.

On 11 February 2022, Bragi joined Västra Frölunda.

In March 2023, Bragi was attending training camp with Fylkir.

International career
Bragi played 11 matches for the Iceland U17 and U19 teams from 2009 and 2011.

Singing career
He ended up placing in shared third place along with William Segerdahl in the 30 November semifinal.

On 28 January 2023, it was announced that Bragi would be competing in  2023, the national selection to select the Icelandic entry for the Eurovision Song Contest 2023. On 4 March, he finished in the top five in the competition.

References

External links

Living people
1993 births
Idol (Swedish TV series) participants
Association football midfielders
Swedish footballers
Bragi Bergsson
Bragi Bergsson
GAIS players
Bragi Bergsson
IK Oddevold players
Utsiktens BK players
Västra Frölunda IF players
21st-century Swedish singers
21st-century Swedish male singers